Aleksandar Trajkovski (born 5 September 1992) is a Macedonian professional footballer who plays for Saudi Professional League club Al-Fayha and the North Macedonia national team. Mainly a forward, he can also play as a winger or an attacking midfielder.

Club career
Trajkovski began his career with FK Cementarnica 55. In May 2010, he joined Chelsea in a trial, scoring the winning goal against Botafogo at the U-19 Copa Amsterdam tournament which guaranteed Chelsea a place in the semi-finals.

After a few years with Cementarnica Skopje, he signed for Inter Zaprešić in the summer of 2010. Good performances in the second half of the season attracted the interest of Dinamo Zagreb, but Trajkovski said that he was not interested in a possible move. At the end of the season, R.S.C. Anderlecht was interested in buying Trajkovski, but their offer of a €500,000 transfer fee was rejected. He joined the Belgian club Zulte Waregem for the new 2011–12 season after their offer of €1.1m was accepted by Inter Zaprešić.

In the summer of 2015, he moved to Italian Serie A club Palermo, signing a five-year contract. In the same year, he was named "Macedonian footballer of the year". Following Palermo's exclusion from the Serie B, he was released together with all other players in July 2019.

On 7 August 2019, Trajkovski agreed to a four-year contract with La Liga newcomers RCD Mallorca. After two seasons at Mallorca, Trajkovski was loaned out to Danish Superliga club AaB on 31 August 2021, for the rest of the season.

On 30 January 2022, Trajkovski joined Saudi club Al-Fayha on an 18-month contract. On 19 May 2022, he won the 2022 King Cup Final with Al-Fayha against Al Hilal.

International career
On 22 May 2012, the Macedonia U21 national team defeated the Netherlands 1–0 in a friendly, with the lone goal scored by Trajkovski.

He made his senior debut for Macedonia on 10 August 2011 in a 1–0 friendly victory away to Azerbaijan, and scored his first goal two years and four days later to conclude a 2–0 home win over neighbours Bulgaria in another exhibition. He scored a hat-trick on 12 November 2015 in a 4–1 win over Montenegro at the Philip II Stadium in Skopje. 

Trajkovski was selected for UEFA Euro 2020, North Macedonia's first major tournament. On 24 March 2022, he scored a last-minute long-range goal in the 2022 FIFA World Cup qualifying playoff semi-finals to beat Italy 1–0 at his former club ground in Palermo, eliminating Italy from the FIFA World Cup for a second consecutive time.

Career statistics

Club

International

Scores and results list North Macedonia's goal tally first, score column indicates score after each Trajkovski goal.

Honours
Al-Fayha
King Cup: 2021–22

Notes

External links

 
 Profile at Macedonian Football 
 
LaLiga Profile

1992 births
Living people
Footballers from Skopje
Macedonian footballers
North Macedonia under-21 international footballers
North Macedonia international footballers
Association football wingers
Association football forwards
UEFA Euro 2020 players
FK Cementarnica 55 players
NK Inter Zaprešić players
S.V. Zulte Waregem players
K.V. Mechelen players
Palermo F.C. players
RCD Mallorca players
AaB Fodbold players
Al-Fayha FC players
Macedonian Second Football League players
Croatian Football League players
Belgian Pro League players
Serie A players
Serie B players
La Liga players
Segunda División players
Danish Superliga players
Saudi Professional League players
Macedonian expatriate footballers
Expatriate footballers in Croatia
Expatriate footballers in Belgium
Expatriate footballers in Italy
Expatriate footballers in Spain
Expatriate men's footballers in Denmark
Expatriate footballers in Saudi Arabia
Macedonian expatriate sportspeople in Croatia
Macedonian expatriate sportspeople in Belgium
Macedonian expatriate sportspeople in Italy
Macedonian expatriate sportspeople in Spain
Macedonian expatriate sportspeople in Denmark
Macedonian expatriate sportspeople in Saudi Arabia